Bethanie Mattek-Sands and Lucie Šafářová were the defending champions, but Mattek-Sands chose not to participate this year. Šafářová played alongside Sabine Lisicki, but lost in the semifinals to Martina Hingis and Sania Mirza.
Caroline Garcia and Kristina Mladenovic won the title, defeating Hingis and Mirza in the final, 2–6, 6–1, [10–6].

Seeds

Draw

References
 Main Draw

Porsche Tennis Grand Prixandnbsp;- Doubles
2016 Doubles